Victor Mbaoma (born 20 October 1996) is a Nigerian international footballer who plays for FC Qizilqum, as a Centre forward.

Club career
Born in Lagos, Ifeanyi spent his early career with Remo Stars F.C., Akwa United and Enyimba F.C. After his stint with Remo Stars F.C., he moved to Eyinmba football club in 2019 after Remo Stars was relegated from the Nigeria professional football league.

Victor was one of the highest goal scorers in the league and this led to his call up to the Nigeria National Team. He scored 16 goals in 21 games for his Eyinmba side. 

One of the major highlights of his career was his call up to the Nigeria Super Eagles team in 2022 for the friendly games between Mexico and Ecuador in 2022.

International career
He made his international debut for Nigeria in 2022 during the International Friendly call up games between Mexico and Ecuador.

Victor was unveiled in January 2023 by FC Qizilqum Zarafshon after he was signed from Algerian topflight league side,  Mouloudia Club d’Alger.

He was signed by Algerian Club, Mouloudia Club d'Alger on a two-year deal in June, 2022.

References

1996 births
Living people
Nigerian footballers
Nigerian expatriate footballers
Nigeria international footballers
Association football midfielders
Remo Stars F.C. players
Akwa United F.C. players
Enyimba F.C. players
FC Qizilqum Zarafshon players
Uzbekistan Super League players
Nigerian expatriate sportspeople in Algeria
Nigerian expatriate sportspeople in Uzbekistan
Expatriate footballers in Algeria
Expatriate footballers in Uzbekistan
Nigeria A' international footballers